Brenden Hall,  (born 27 May 1993) is an Australian Paralympic amputee swimmer who won two gold medals at the 2012 Summer Paralympics in London. He represented Australia at the 2016 Rio Paralympics where he won one gold, one silver and one bronze medal. He competed at  2020 Summer Paralympics, his fourth games.

Personal
Hall was born on 27 May 1993 in the Queensland town of Nambour.  At the age of six, he had his right leg amputated after complications from chicken pox. The disease also resulted in the loss of 70% of his hearing. Initially he was reliant on a wheelchair but in the mid-2000s he was fitted with a prosthetic leg. Hall said "didn't really care how I walked, just that I could walk". Hall attended Petrie State School. In 2017, he completed a Bachelor of Exercise and Sports Science at the University of Queensland.  In 2021, he is halfway through a Bachelor of Physiotherapy at the Australian Catholic University. He is an ambassador for the Aspiration for Kids programme. and Sporting Wheelies and Disabled Association's Game Changers.

Career

Before his amputation, he was a member of a mini development squad and returned to swimming after his amputation had healed. He made his international swimming debut at the 2007 Arafura Games. He was the youngest male on the Australian swimming team at the 2008 Beijing Games. He competed in the Men's 400 m Freestyle S9 and came 5th in the final. He broke the Paralympic record in his heat. At the  2010 IPC Swimming World Championships in Eindhoven he won gold medals in the Men's 400m Freestyle S9, Men's 5 km Open Water S1-S10, Men's 4 x 100 m Freestyle Relay 34 points (Heat) Men's 4 x 100 m Medley Relay 34 points (Heat).  In 2011, at the Queensland Swimming Championships he broke world records in the 800 m and 1500 m Freestyle events.

At the 2012 London Games, Hall won two gold medals in the Men's 400 m Freestyle S9 and Men's 4 x 100 m Freestyle Relay 34 points and a bronze medal in the Men's 4 x 100 m Medley Relay 34 points. He also participated in the S9 class of the Men's 100 m Backstroke, 100 m Butterfly S9, 100 m Freestyle and 50 m Freestyle events – as well as the 200 m Individual Medley SM9.

, Hall holds S9 world records in the 400 m, 800 m and 1500 m freestyle events. Competing at the 2013 IPC Swimming World Championships in Montreal, Quebec, Canada, he won two gold medals in the Men's 400m Freestyle S9 and Men's 4 × 100 m Freestyle Relay (34 points). He broke the world record in winning the Men's 400m Freestyle S9.

At the 2015 IPC Swimming World Championships, Hall won the gold medals in the Men's 100 m Backstroke S9  and Men's 400 m Freestyle S9 and bronze medals in the Men's 100 m Freestyle S9 and Men's 4 × 100 m Freestyle Relay 34 points. He finished fifth in the Men's 50m Freestyle S9, fifth in the Men's 100m Butterfly S9 and sixth in the Men's 200m Individual Medley SM9.

At the 2016 Rio Paralympics, Hall won the gold medal in the Men's 400 m Freestyle S9, silver medal in the Men's 100 m Freestyle S9 and bronze medal in the Men's 100 m Backstroke S9. He also competed in the following events: Men's 100m Butterfly S9 finishing fourth, Men's 4 × 100 m Medley Relay (34 points) placing fourth, Men's 200m Individual Medley SM9 where he was disqualified and Men's 50m Freestyle S9 not progressing to the finals.

In preparation for Rio, Hall stated: "The fire's there. I love being in the water. I'm just aiming to have a good Games and defend the 400m. My training is based around the 400m. That's the one I want to do best in." After winning the gold medal at Rio, Hall says: "We're very excited, very relieved, I think the party's only begun tonight, but still got about five events to go, so hopefully we'll figure again."

At the 2019 World Para Swimming Championships in London, Hall won the silver medal in the Men's 400 m Freestyle S9.

At the 2020 Tokyo Paralympics, Hall competed in three events but did not medal. He reached the final of the 400 m freestyle S9 and come fourth. He also reached the final of the 100 m backstroke S9 and came eighth. He did not advance to the final of the 100 m butterfly S9.

Hall won the bronze medal in the Men's 400 m Freestyle at the 2022 World Para Swimming Championships, Madeira.

At the 2022 Birmingham Commonwealth Games, he finished 5th in the Men's 100m Backstroke S9.

Recognition
Hall was awarded a Medal of the Order of Australia in the 2014 Australia Day Honours "for service to sport as a Gold Medallist at the London 2012 Paralympic Games." In 2015, he won the Queensland Athlete with a Disability Award, the third time he had won this award.

See also

 Australia at the Paralympics
 Australian Paralympic Swim Team

References

External links
 
 
 

Male Paralympic swimmers of Australia
Swimmers at the 2008 Summer Paralympics
Swimmers at the 2012 Summer Paralympics
Swimmers at the 2016 Summer Paralympics
Swimmers at the 2020 Summer Paralympics
Paralympic gold medalists for Australia
Paralympic silver medalists for Australia
Paralympic bronze medalists for Australia
Amputee category Paralympic competitors
Living people
1993 births
Recipients of the Medal of the Order of Australia
World record holders in paralympic swimming
Swimmers at the 2014 Commonwealth Games
Swimmers at the 2018 Commonwealth Games
Swimmers at the 2022 Commonwealth Games
Commonwealth Games bronze medallists for Australia
Commonwealth Games gold medallists for Australia
Medalists at the 2012 Summer Paralympics
Medalists at the 2016 Summer Paralympics
S9-classified Paralympic swimmers
Commonwealth Games medallists in swimming
Medalists at the World Para Swimming Championships
Paralympic medalists in swimming
Australian male freestyle swimmers
Australian male backstroke swimmers
People from Nambour, Queensland
20th-century Australian people
21st-century Australian people
Medallists at the 2014 Commonwealth Games
Medallists at the 2018 Commonwealth Games